American actress and producer Sandra Bullock has received numerous accolades throughout her career, including nominations for two Academy Awards, one British Academy Film Award, three Screen Actors Guild Awards, and five Golden Globe Awards.

For her performance in the biographical drama film The Blind Side (2009), Bullock received the Academy Award for Best Actress, the Golden Globe Award for Best Actress in a Motion Picture – Drama, and the Screen Actors Guild Award for Outstanding Performance by a Female Actor in a Leading Role. She was once again nominated in these same categories, as well as for the BAFTA Award for Best Actress in a Leading Role, for her performance in the science fiction film Gravity (2013).

In 2005, Bullock was honored with the 2,281st star on the Hollywood Walk of Fame, in recognition of her contributions to the motion picture industry.

Awards and nominations

Other miscellaneous awards

Notes

References

External links 
 

Bullock, Sandra